Så vill stjärnorna is a song written by Bobby Ljunggren, Marcos Ubeda and Ingela "Pling" Forsman, and performed by Molly Sandén at Melodifestivalen 2009. The song participated in the third semifinal inside the Ejendals Arena in Leksand on 21 February 2009, from where it made it to the finals, where it ended up 11th.

The single peaked at 11th position at the Swedish singles chart. On 12 April 2009, the song entered Svensktoppen, where it ended up 9th the first week, only to have been knocked out of chart the upcoming week.

The song appeared on Molly Sandén's debut album Samma himmel.

Charts

References

2009 singles
Melodifestivalen songs of 2009
Molly Sandén songs
Songs written by Bobby Ljunggren
Songs with lyrics by Ingela Forsman
Songs written by Marcos Ubeda
2009 songs
Swedish songs
Swedish-language songs